was a Japanese electrical scientist from Matsusaka, Mie. In the 1920s, he invented a simple device for phototelegraphic transmission through cable and later via radio, a precursor to mechanical television. He later became the Director of the Department of Electronic Engineering of University of Tokyo. He was awarded the Order of Cultural Merits and the Order of Merit of the First Class.

On April 18, 1985, the Japan Patent Office selected him as one of Ten Japanese Great Inventors.

References

1893 births
1975 deaths
People from Mie Prefecture
Japanese electrical engineers
Laureates of the Imperial Prize
University of Tokyo alumni
20th-century Japanese inventors
20th-century Japanese  engineers